Raymonde Verlinden  (born 25 September 1945 in Kessel) is a Belgian archer. Verlinden competed in two world championships. At the 1984 Summer Olympic Games she finished 40th in the women's individual event.

Verlinden's son, Nico Hendrickx, also represented Belgium at the 2000 Summer Olympic Games in archery.

References

External links 
 Profile on worldarchery.org

1945 births
Living people
Belgian female archers
Olympic archers of Belgium
Archers at the 1984 Summer Olympics
Sportspeople from Antwerp Province